The Second Baird ministry was the 95th ministry of the Government of New South Wales, and was led by Mike Baird, the state's 44th Premier. It is the second and subsequent of two occasions when Baird served as Premier.

The Liberal–National coalition ministry was formed following the 2015 state election where the Baird government was re-elected.

Composition of ministry
Baird announced his ministry on 1 April 2015 and the ministry was sworn in on 2 April 2015 at Government House by the Governor of New South Wales David Hurley. The only change to the ministry was the resignation of Troy Grant as Deputy Premier in November 2016 following the loss of the Orange state by-election. John Barilaro replaced him as Leader of the National Party and Deputy Premier.

The ministry ended upon the resignation by Baird as Premier, and the swearing in of Gladys Berejiklian as the Premier and John Barilaro as Deputy Premier on 23 January 2017.

 
Ministers are members of the Legislative Assembly unless otherwise noted.

See also

Members of the New South Wales Legislative Assembly, 2015–2019
Members of the New South Wales Legislative Council, 2015–2019

Notes

References

 

! colspan=3 style="border-top: 5px solid #cccccc" | New South Wales government ministries

New South Wales ministries
2015 establishments in Australia
2017 disestablishments in Australia